ho., also known as ho-mobile, is an Italian Mobile Virtual Network Operator offered by VEI S.r.l., a telecommunications company wholly-owned by Vodafone Italia S.p.A.

History 
On 23 January 2017 the company VEI S.r.l. was founded. as a low-cost operator of Vodafone Italia S.p.A.; the name of the company is in fact the acronym of Vodafone Enabler Italia.

The launch of the service, branded ho. (or ho-mobile) took place on June 22, 2018 a few weeks after Iliad arrived in Italy.

Although it received authorization from the Ministry of Economic Development to operate as a Full MVNO and only under the 379-1 prefix, the operator was launched as an ESP MVNO, adopting the 377-08 and 377-09 prefixes. Later the area codes 379-1 and 379-2 were introduced.

See also 
 Vodafone Group
 Vodafone Italy

References

External links 
 

Vodafone
Telecommunications
Telecommunications companies of Italy
Mobile telecommunications
Mobile telecommunication services
Mobile phone companies of Italy